Matzevah or masseba ( maṣṣēḇā; "pillar") is a term used in the Hebrew Bible for a sacred pillar, a type of standing stone. The term has been adopted by archaeologists for Israelite contexts, seldom for related cultures, such as the Canaanite and the Nabataean ones. As a second derived meaning, it is also used for a headstone or tombstone marking a Jewish grave.

Etymology
The Hebrew word matzevah is derived from a root meaning 'to stand', which lead to the meaning of 'pillar'.

The singular form can be found spelled as masseba, maseba, matzevah, matzeva or mazzevah, and the plural form as massebot, masseboth, masebot, matzevot or matzevoth. When used in a Yiddish-influenced context, it can take the form matzeivah.

Biblical narrative

In , Jacob says "and this stone, which I have set up for a pillar (matzevah), shall be God's house" and in  Yahweh says to Jacob "I am the God of Bethel [lit. "House of God"] where you anointed a pillar (matzevah) and made a vow to me...".

Jewish tombstone
Based on Genesis 35:20, observant Jews traditionally erect a monument at the grave of a deceased person. It can be placed either over the grave, as a footstone, or as a headstone.

Three purposes can be distinguished. It may mark the gravesite for purity reasons, as priests (cohanim) are required to avoid defilement through contact with the dead, and a marker (any marker) helps them identify a grave. The name of the deceased written on a stone also allows friends and relatives to identify the grave. A respectable, but unostentatious monument appropriate to heirs' fortune is also a symbolic way to honour the deceased.

See also
 Asherah pole, Canaanite sacred tree or pole honouring Asherah, consort of El
 Baetylus, a type of sacred standing stone
 Bema and bimah, elevated platform
 Ceremonial pole
 High place, raised place of worship
 Lingam, abstract representation of the Hindu god Shiva
 Menhir, orthostat, or standing stone: upright stone, typically from the Bronze Age
 Pole worship
 Stele, stone or wooden slab erected as a monument

References

External link
 "matzeva" at Encyclopædia Britannica online

Burial monuments and structures
Jewish cemeteries
Hebrew Bible objects
Sacred rocks